Pictorium is a genus of sea snails, marine gastropod mollusks in the subfamily Bittiinae of the family Cerithiidae.

Species
Species within the genus Pictorium include:
 Pictorium koperbergi (Schepman, 1907)
 Pictorium versicolor E. E. Strong & Bouchet, 2013
 Pictorium violaceum E. E. Strong & Bouchet, 2013

References

 Strong E.E. & Bouchet P. (2013) Cryptic yet colorful: anatomy and relationships of a new genus of Cerithiidae (Caenogastropoda, Cerithioidea) from coral reef drop-offs. Invertebrate Biology 132(4): 326–351

Cerithiidae